Folopa (also Podopa, Polopa, Podoba, or Foraba) is a language of Papua New Guinea.

References

Teberan languages
Languages of Gulf Province
Languages of Southern Highlands Province